Geraestus or Geraistos may refer to:

Mythical figures:
Geraestus, a son of Zeus and brother of Taenarus
Geraestus, a Cyclops on whose grave in Attica Hyacinthus of Lacedaemon had his daughters sacrificed

Geographical names:
Geraistos, the southernmost cape of Euboea, now Cape Mandelo
Geraestus (Euboea), an ancient port in Euboea